Belogorye is a rural locality (a selo) and the administrative center of Beloroyevskoye Rural Settlement, Podgorensky District, Voronezh Oblast, Russia. The population was 2,171 as of 2010. There are 28 streets.

Geography 
Belogorye is located 32 km northeast of Podgorensky (the district's administrative centre) by road. Aleksandrovka Donskaya is the nearest rural locality.

References 

Rural localities in Podgorensky District